Kilovče (in older sources Küllenberg) is a small village north of Prem in the Municipality of Ilirska Bistrica in the Inner Carniola region of Slovenia.

Church
The local church in the settlement is dedicated to Mary Magdalene and belongs to the Parish of Prem.

Notable people
Notable people that were born or lived in Kilovče include:
Matija Kastelec (1620–1688), Roman Catholic priest and lexicographer

References

External links 
Kilovče on Geopedia

Populated places in the Municipality of Ilirska Bistrica